Pramet is a municipality in the district of Ried im Innkreis in the Austrian state of Upper Austria.

Geography
Pramet lies in the Innviertel. About 31 percent of the municipality is forest, and 59 percent is farmland.

References

Cities and towns in Ried im Innkreis District